The bicipital aponeurosis (also known as lacertus fibrosus) is a broad aponeurosis of the biceps brachii, which is located in the cubital fossa of the elbow. It separates superficial from deep structures in much of the fossa.

Structure 
The bicipital aponeurosis originates from the distal insertion of the biceps brachii, and inserts into the deep fascia of the forearm. The biceps tendon inserts on the radial tuberosity, and the bicipital aponeurosis lies medially to it. It reinforces the cubital fossa, helping to protect the brachial artery and the median nerve running underneath.

Variations 
Some individuals (about 3% of the population) have a superficial ulnar artery that runs superficially to the bicipital aponeurosis instead of underneath it. These individuals are at risk for accidental injury to the ulnar artery during venipuncture.

Clinical significance 
The bicipital aponeurosis is superficial to the brachial artery and the median nerve, but deep to the median cubital vein. This protection is important during venipuncture (taking blood).

It is one structure that has to be incised during fasciotomy in the treatment of acute compartment syndrome of the forearm and elbow region.

References

External links
 Diagram at radsource.edu (seventh diagram from top)
  - "Flexor Region of the Forearm: Muscles that Border the Cubital Fossa"

Upper limb anatomy